This is a list of Scottish people of some Jewish background, or Jewish people with a Scottish background or connection.

See History of the Jews in Scotland for more information.

Academic figures and scientists 
 Ruth Adler, child welfare campaigner and human rights campaigner
 Charlotte Auerbach, geneticist
 Philip Cohen, FRS FRSE researcher, academic and Royal Medal winner; based at St Andrews and Dundee
 David Daiches, writer and literary critic; father of Jenni Calder
 Jack D. Dunitz, chemist
 Alfred Edersheim, Bible scholar
 Charles Frank, maker of scientific instruments
 Ralph Glasser, psychologist, economist, author of The Gorbals Trilogy
 Professor Sir Abraham Goldberg, Emeritus Regius Professor of the Practice of Medicine, University of Glasgow
 Philip Hobsbaum, academic and literary critic at Glasgow University; an influence on many Scottish writers as diverse as Aonghas MacNeacail and Jeff Torrington
 Peter Kravitz, editor of the compilation Contemporary Scottish Fiction; literary critic
 Stefan Reif, professor	
 J. M. Robson, geneticist and physicist, lived and worked in Edinburgh	
 George Sassoon, scientist, electronic engineer, linguist, translator and author; buried on Mull, where he spent much of his childhood
 Leonard Schapiro, historian
 Avivah Gottlieb Zornberg, contemporary Torah scholar and author

Arts, literature and music 
 Jenni Calder, literary figure and daughter of David Daiches
 Ivor Cutler, poet, songwriter and humourist
 Hannah Frank, sculptor, studied under Benno Schotz
 Muriel Gray, author, The Tube presenter
 Jeremy Isaacs, broadcaster
 David Knopfler, member of Dire Straits.
 Mark Knopfler, co-founder (with brother David), lead vocalist, and lead guitarist for the band Dire Straits
 Daniel Lobell, stand-up comedian and podcaster
 Macdonald brothers, grandsons of the Hungarian-born English filmmaker Emeric Pressburger
 Andrew Macdonald, producer, Trainspotting 
 Kevin Macdonald, director, Touching the Void
Miriam Margolyes (Actress) Harry Potter Isi Metzstein, modernist architect
 Saul Metzstein, director of Late Night Shopping Rebecca Pidgeon, actress, singer and songwriter, grew up in Edinburgh
 Jack Ronder Author, dramatist, playwright
 Hugo Rifkind, journalist
 Shulman brothers (Simon Dupree and the Big Sound; Gentle Giant), rock musicians, born in Glasgow
 Derek Shulman, multi-instrumentalist and songwriter
 Phil Shulman, multi-instrumentalist and songwriter
 Ray Shulman, multi-instrumentalist and songwriter
 Howie B, DJ, musician and producer
 J. David Simons, author
 Edith Simon, artist
 Muriel Spark, writer, The Prime of Miss Jean Brodie Robin Spark, Scottish artist, convert to Judaism (albeit with some Jewish ancestry)
 Scottie Wilson, artist and designer, born in Glasgow
 Eric Woolfson, musician and composer, founding member of The Alan Parsons Project

Politicians

 Myer Galpern, Labour MP
 Malcolm Rifkind, Conservative MP
 Manny Shinwell, Labour MP

Athletes
 Gary Jacobs, Scottish, British, Commonwealth, and European (EBU) boxing champion welterweight

 Business and the professions 

 Hazel Cosgrove, Lady Cosgrove, first female Court of Session judge
 Esta Henry, art and antiques dealer in the 20th century
 Sir Isaac Wolfson, businessman and philanthropist

 Religious and communal leaders 
 Rabbi Salis Daiches, father of David Daiches
 Rabbi Cyril Harris, Chief Rabbi of South Africa
 Rabbi Shmuel Yitzchak Hillman
 Rabbi Yaakov Benzion Mendelson
 Rabbi Nancy Morris, first female rabbi in Scotland
 Rabbi Louis Isaac Rabinowitz
 Rabbi Naftoli Shapiro

 Show business 

 Ronni Ancona (Sephardi), comedian
 Arnold Brown, comedian
 Jerry Sadowitz, comedian

 People of Scottish-Jewish heritage / Jews of Scottish extraction 

 Simon Cowell, British presenter of The X Factor David Duchovny, American actor, X-Files''
 Isla Fisher, Australian actress, born to Scottish parents, converted to Judaism upon marriage to Sacha Baron Cohen; has described herself as "quite observant"
 Oscar Hammerstein II, American lyricist, librettist, and theatrical producer
Norman Swan, born in Scotland and emigrated to Australia in adulthood, a qualified paediatrician who is known for his work as a science and medical broadcaster on ABC
 Zarif, singer

See also 
 History of the Jews in Scotland

References 

Scotland
 
Scotland
Jews
Jews,Scottish